Crocidomera is a genus of snout moths. It was described by Zeller, in 1848.

Species
 Crocidomera fissuralis (Walker, 1863)
 Crocidomera imitata Neunzig, 1990
 Crocidomera turbidella Zeller, 1848

References

Phycitinae